Desmond Koh Mun Kit (born 19 May 1973) is a former competitive swimmer from Singapore and represented the nation in numerous international competitions over a period of more than 10 years including 5 years as National Captain.

Swimming career 
Koh represented Singapore in three Olympics (1988, 1992, 1996), three Asian Games (1990, 1994, 1998), one Commonwealth Games (1998), one World Championships (1991) and five Southeast Asian Games (1987, 1989, 1991, 1993, 1995).

Koh had four national records, including:
200m Breaststroke - 2:21.87, 29 July 1992
400m Individual Medley - 4:28.95, 27 July 1992

Business career 

Koh is the Managing Director at an international private bank and his team serves private families and family offices in Southeast Asia. He leads a sustainability taskforce at the bank and runs "ConsciousCircle", a community of asset and wealth owners.

Koh sits on Boards of several non-profit entities in Singapore and USA, focused education and health.

Education 
Koh graduated from the University of Southern California with a degree in Electrical Engineering and was awarded a Rhodes Scholarship to study at Oxford where he obtained an MPhil in Management Studies (Finance and Economics).

Personal life 
Koh's younger brother, Gerald, also represented Singapore at the Olympics.

Koh married Nadya Hutagalung, an Indonesian-Australian model and actress.

References

External links
 
Singapore Swimming Association
https://web.archive.org/web/20070402141721/http://www.sportinc.net/ Koh's blog

1973 births
Living people
Anglo-Chinese School alumni
Swimmers at the 1988 Summer Olympics
Swimmers at the 1992 Summer Olympics
Swimmers at the 1996 Summer Olympics
Olympic swimmers of Singapore
Swimmers at the 1998 Commonwealth Games
Commonwealth Games competitors for Singapore
Swimmers at the 1990 Asian Games
Swimmers at the 1994 Asian Games
Swimmers at the 1998 Asian Games
Singaporean people of Chinese descent
USC Viterbi School of Engineering alumni
Singaporean Rhodes Scholars
Singaporean Buddhists
Singaporean male breaststroke swimmers
Singaporean male medley swimmers
Southeast Asian Games medalists in swimming
Southeast Asian Games silver medalists for Singapore
Southeast Asian Games bronze medalists for Singapore
Competitors at the 1987 Southeast Asian Games
Competitors at the 1989 Southeast Asian Games
Competitors at the 1991 Southeast Asian Games
Competitors at the 1993 Southeast Asian Games
Competitors at the 1995 Southeast Asian Games
Asian Games competitors for Singapore